ChinaSat 9, also known as ZX-9, is a Chinese communications satellite.

Launch 
It was launched from pad 2 at the Xichang Satellite Launch Centre on 9 June 2008, at 12:15:04 UTC, by a Long March 3B launch vehicle. It is based on the Spacebus 4000C2 satellite bus, and was constructed in France by Thales Alenia Space in its Cannes Mandelieu Space Center. It is one of several ChinaSat spacecraft in orbit.

Mission 
It was launched to act as a relay satellite for the 2008 Olympic Games, and will subsequently be used for general communications. Equipped with 22 Ku-band transponders, it was placed in geosynchronous orbit at a longitude of 92.2° East.

References 

Communications satellites of China
Satellites of China
Spacecraft launched in 2008
2008 in spaceflight
2008 in China
Satellites orbiting Earth
Satellites using the Spacebus bus
Spacecraft launched by Long March rockets